Jack Kaiser Stadium, originally known as The Ballpark at St. John’s, is a baseball stadium located on the campus of St. John's University in the neighborhood of Hillcrest near the neighborhoods of Jamaica and Fresh Meadows in New York City. Formerly used by the now-defunct Queens Kings minor league team in its inaugural season of 2000, it is currently used by the St. John's Red Storm baseball team.

History
After the 1999 season, the New York Mets purchased the St. Catharines Stompers of the New York–Penn League, planning to move them from Ontario to Brooklyn. However, the stadium for the newly minted Brooklyn Cyclones would not be ready until 2001 (nor would their affiliation contract with the Toronto Blue Jays expire until then), so the Mets decided to "park" the franchise in Queens for the 2000 season, dubbing them the Queens Kings. Striking a deal with St. John's University, the Mets built a ballpark for the Kings, then donated it to the school and the Red Storm college baseball team, which plays in Division I Big East Conference of the NCAA.  In 2007, the stadium was named for St. John's All-American baseball player John W. "Jack" Kaiser. Kaiser, who played in the late 1940s, was head coach of the baseball team from 1956–1973, athletic director from 1973–1995, and is currently emeritus athletic director at St. John's University. The stadium holds 3,500 people.

See also
 List of NCAA Division I baseball venues

References

External links
 Official Website

College baseball venues in the United States
St. John's Red Storm baseball
Sports venues in Queens, New York
Baseball venues in New York City
Fresh Meadows, Queens
Defunct minor league baseball venues
2000 establishments in New York City
Sports venues completed in 2000